Delta Cancri (δ Cancri, abbreviated Delta Cnc, δ Cnc) is a double star about 180 light-years from the Sun in the constellation of Cancer.

Its two main constituents are designated Delta Cancri A and B. A is itself a binary star whose components are Delta Cancri Aa (formally named Asellus Australis , the traditional name of the entire system) and Ab.

The star system is 0.08 degree north of the ecliptic, so it can be occulted by the Moon and more rarely by planets; it is occulted (eclipsed) by the sun from about 31 July to 2 August. Thus the star can be viewed the whole night, crossing the sky at the start of February.

Nomenclature
δ Cancri (Latinised to Delta Cancri) is the system's Bayer designation. The designations of the two constituents Delta Cancri A and B, and those of A's components - Delta Cancri Aa and Ab - derive from the convention used by the Washington Multiplicity Catalog (WMC) for multiple star systems, and adopted by the International Astronomical Union (IAU).

It bore the traditional name Asellus Australis which is Latin for "southern donkey colt". In 2016, the International Astronomical Union organized a Working Group on Star Names (WGSN) to catalogue and standardize proper names for stars. The WGSN decided to attribute proper names to individual stars rather than entire multiple systems. It approved the name Asellus Australis for the component Delta Cancri Aa on 6 November 2016 and it is now so included in the List of IAU-approved Star Names. Together with Gamma Cancri, it formed the Aselli, flanking Praesepe.

As Arkū-sha-nangaru-sha-shūtu, which means "the southeast star in the Crab", it marked the 13th ecliptic station of the ancient Babylonians.

In Chinese astronomy, Ghost refers to an asterism consisting of Theta Cancri, Eta Cancri, Gamma Cancri and Delta Cancri. Delta Cancri itself is known as the fourth star of Ghost.

Observations
Delta Cancri was involved in the first recorded occultation by Jupiter:

Delta Cancri also marks the famous open star cluster Praesepe (or the Beehive Cluster, also known as Messier 44). In ancient times M44 was used as a weather gauge as the following Greek rhyme from Aratos' Prognostica reveals:

The meaning of this verse is that if Asellus Borealis or Gamma Cancris is hidden by clouds, the wind will be from the south and that situation will be reversed if Asellus Australis is obscured. There is some doubt however as to the accuracy of this as Allen notes: "Our modern Weather Bureau would probably tell us that if one of these stars were thus concealed, the other also would be." (Allen, 1898)

But Delta Cancri also acts as more than just a dubious weather guide: it is a reliable signpost for finding the vividly red star X Cancri as Patrick Moore notes in his guidebook Stars of the Southern Skies:

Delta Cancri also marks the radiant of the Delta Cancrids meteor shower.

In 1876, the possibility of Delta Cancri having a companion star was proposed.

References

Books
 
 
 
 
 
 

Cancri, Delta
Cancer (constellation)
K-type giants
Asellus Australis
Cancri, 47
042911
074442
3461
Durchmusterung objects